Aituaria nataliae  is the type species of Aituaria, a genus of araneomorph spiders of the family Nesticidae. It occurs in the steppes of the southern Urals.

Original publication

References 

Nesticidae
Spiders described in 1998
Spiders of Russia